The 2016–17 Serie B (known as the Serie B ConTe.it for sponsorship reasons) was the 85th season since its establishment in 1929. A total of 22 teams were contesting the league: 15 returning from the 2015–16 season, 4 promoted from Lega Pro, and 3 relegated from Serie A.

Teams

Stadia and locations

Number of teams by regions

Personnel and kits

Managerial changes

League table

Promotion play-offs
According to the regulations, third-placed Frosinone would have avoided the play-offs if they had ended the regular season 10 points clear of fourth place. However, in the last round, Perugia and Benevento won their matches to leave the gap at nine points.

Six teams contested the promotion playoffs. A preliminary one-legged round, played at the home venue of the higher placed team, involved the teams from 5th to 8th place. The two winning teams played against the 3rd and 4th-placed teams in two-legged semi-finals. The higher placed team played the second leg of the promotion playoff at home.

Top goalscorers 

Source:

Results

Attendance data

References

Serie B seasons
Italy
2016–17 in Italian football leagues